Natalya German (born 10 November 1963) is a Ukrainian former track and field sprinter who competed for the Soviet Union.

Born in Dniprodzerzhynsk, Ukrainian SSR, she had a very brief period of success in sprinting. In 1987 she won the 200 metres at the Soviet Athletics Championships with a time of 23.25 seconds. This was the slowest winning recorded at the competition after the introduction of fully automatic timing equipment. However, she achieved a much quicker personal best in Chelyabinsk that year of 22.47 seconds. This ranked her as the 13th fastest in the world for the discipline that year.

German's sole appearance at a major athletics competition came at the 1987 World Championships in Athletics. She did not perform well individually, being eliminated in the first round as the fastest non-qualifier. Success awaited her in the relay, however, as she ran the curve leg in a Soviet women's team including Irina Slyusar, Natalya Pomoshchnikova, and Olga Antonova. The team ended up a clear third place behind the American and East German women.

National titles
Soviet Athletics Championships
200 metres: 1987

International competitions

References

Living people
1963 births
People from Kamianske
Ukrainian female sprinters
Soviet female sprinters
World Athletics Championships athletes for the Soviet Union
World Athletics Championships medalists
Sportspeople from Dnipropetrovsk Oblast